The electoral district of Northcote  is an electoral district of the Victorian Legislative Assembly. It covers the suburbs of Alphington, Fairfield, Northcote, Thornbury, and part of Preston. It lies on the northern bank of the Yarra River between the Merri and Darebin creeks.

The seat was created in 1927 as a replacement for Jika Jika, and has been a safe Labor seat for most of its existence.  It has only been held by seven members. The seat's most historically prominent member is 34th Premier John Cain (senior). Upon Cain's death in 1957, he was succeeded by Frank Wilkes, who went on to become state Labor leader from 1977 to 1981.

Former ABC newsreader Mary Delahunty was elected in a 1998 by-election. As the electorate was safe for the Labor Party, the Liberals declined to nominate a candidate. However, partly due to the presence of a One Nation candidate, the Liberals took the unusual step of campaigning for the Australian Democrats, issuing a 'How to Vote Liberal' card which advocated voting Democrat, and then Premier Jeff Kennett also wrote to voters urging them to vote Democrat.

While the law has since been changed stopping political parties campaigning directly for other political parties, that the seat has been traditionally safe for Labor has meant the Liberals have often run dead. Since the turn of the millennium, they have often been pushed into third place on the primary vote, allowing other parties, like the Greens in 2002, to become the main challengers to Labor. The Greens eventually won the seat in a 2017 by-election following the death of Labor member Fiona Richardson. However, Labor regained the seat at the following election in 2018.

Members for Northcote

Election results

References

External links
 Electorate profile: Northcote District, Victorian Electoral Commission

Electoral districts of Victoria (Australia)
Constituencies established in 1927
1927 establishments in Australia
City of Darebin
Electoral districts and divisions of Greater Melbourne